Staggered elections are elections where only some of the places in an elected body are up for election at the same time. For example, United States senators have a six-year term, but they are not all elected at the same time. Rather, elections are held every two years for one-third of Senate seats.

Staggered elections have the effect of limiting control of a representative body by the body being represented, but can also minimize the impact of cumulative voting. Many companies use staggered elections as a tool to prevent takeover attempts. Some legislative bodies (most commonly upper houses) use staggered elections, as do some public bodies, such as the Securities and Exchange Commission.

Application in business
A staggered board of directors or classified board is a prominent practice in US corporate law governing the board of directors of a company, corporation, or other organization, in which only a fraction (often one third) of the members of the board of directors is elected each time instead of en masse (where all directors have one-year terms).  Each group of directors falls within a specified "class"—e.g., Class I, Class II, etc.—hence the use of the term "classified" board. The work of the Shareholder Rights Project has had a significant effect on the number of classified boards on the S&P 500.

In publicly held companies, staggered boards have the effect of making hostile takeover attempts more difficult; however, they are also associated with lower firm value. When a board is staggered, hostile bidders must win more than one proxy fight at successive shareholder meetings in order to exercise control of the target firm.  Particularly in combination with a poison pill, a staggered board that cannot be dismantled or evaded is one of the most potent takeover defenses available to U.S. companies.

In corporate cumulative voting systems, staggering has two basic effects: it makes it more difficult for a minority group to get directors elected, as the fewer directorships up for election requires a larger percent of the equity to win; and it makes takeover attempts less likely to succeed as it is harder to vote in a majority of new directors. Staggering may also however serve a more beneficial purpose, that is provide "institutional memory" — continuity in the board of directors — which may be significant for corporations with long-range projects and plans.

Institutional shareholders are increasingly calling for an end to staggered boards of directors—also called "declassifying" the boards. The Wall Street Journal reported in January 2007 that 2006 marked a key switch in the trend toward declassification or annual votes on all directors: more than half (55%) of the S&P 500 companies have declassified boards, compared with 47% in 2005.

Use in legislative bodies

National

 In the Australian Senate, a double dissolution election can happen, where all seats are contested. The 4 Territory seats are contested at each election.
 Some chambers do not have all of its seats elected, such as in the Rajya Sabha where 12 seats are appointed by the president.
 By-elections (special elections) can be held concurrently with general elections, increasing the number of seats up in an election.

State

Argentina
12 of the 24 provincial legislatures have staggered elections:

Buenos Aires: Chamber of Deputies and Senate
Buenos Aires City: Unicameral legislature
Catamarca: Chamber of Deputies and Senate
Chaco: Unicameral legislature
Corrientes: Chamber of Deputies and Senate
Formosa: Unicameral legislature
Jujuy: Unicameral legislature
La Rioja: Unicameral legislature
Mendoza: Chamber of Deputies and Senate
Misiones: Unicameral legislature
Salta: Chamber of Deputies and Senate
San Luis: Chamber of Deputies and Senate

Australia
In the federal Senate, half of the Senate's 76 members are eligible for re-election every 3 years. All members elected from states have a 6 year term staggered over two election cycles; senators elected from the ACT and the NT have 3 year terms only. These half-Senate elections are usually held in conjunction with an election of all members for the Federal House of Representatives. There are rare instances in which a Federal election is held for the all members of the House of Representatives and all the members of the Senate at once, this is called a double dissolution election.

Three of Australia's five State Legislative Councils use staggered elections:
 New South Wales Legislative Council
 South Australian Legislative Council
 Tasmanian Legislative Council

Local councils in Western Australia also have staggered elections.

India
All six Legislative councils of states have staggered elections:

Andhra Pradesh Legislative Council
Bihar Legislative Council
Karnataka Legislative Council
Maharashtra Legislative Council
Telangana Legislative Council
Uttar Pradesh Legislative Council

United States
27 of the State Senates in the United States have staggered elections:

 Alaska State Senate
 Arkansas State Senate
 California State Senate
 Colorado State Senate
 Delaware State Senate
 Florida State Senate
 Hawaii State Senate
 Illinois State Senate
 Indiana State Senate
 Iowa Senate
 Kentucky State Senate
 Missouri State Senate
 Montana State Senate
 Nebraska Legislature
 Nevada State Senate
 North Dakota State Senate
 Ohio State Senate
 Oklahoma State Senate
 Oregon State Senate
 Pennsylvania State Senate
 Tennessee State Senate
 Texas State Senate
 Utah State Senate
 Washington State Senate
 West Virginia State Senate
 Wisconsin State Senate
 Wyoming State Senate

Local
 Some local councils in the United Kingdom

Historical usage

National

 General Council of Andorra (1867–1979)
 Chamber of Representatives and Senate of Belgium (1835–1919)
 Senate and Chamber of Deputies of Bolivia (1944–1964)
 Legislative Assembly of Costa Rica (1913–1948)
 Senate and Chamber of Representatives of Cuba (1902–1950)
 Landsting of Denmark (1915–1953)
 National Assembly of Ecuador (1945–1970, 1984–1998)
 National Congress of Honduras (until 1942)
 Chamber of Deputies of Luxembourg (1922–1951)
 House of Representatives (1849–1888) and Senate (1848–1983) of the Netherlands
 National Congress of Nicaragua (1912–1932)
 First Chamber of Sweden (1867–1970)

Local
 Andorra: communal councils (1867–1979)
 Belgium: municipal councils and provincial councils (1836–1914)
 Spain: municipal councils and provincial deputations (until 1923)
 Japan: prefectural assemblies (1878–1890s)

See also
Industrial organization
Mergers and acquisitions
Takeover, including hostile takeover
United Kingdom company law
United States corporate law

Notes

Corporate law
Elections